RidgeGate Parkway station is a light rail station in Lone Tree, Colorado, part of the Regional Transportation District (RTD) system in the Denver metropolitan area. It is the terminus of two lines: the E Line to Union Station and the R Line to Aurora. However, the R Line currently terminates at Lincoln station due to low ridership in this area of Lone Tree which is still under construction and amid generally lower ridership due to the impact of the COVID-19 pandemic on public transport.

The station consists of two side platforms located adjacent to the interchange of Interstate 25 and RidgeGate Parkway. It also has a 1,300-stall parking garage and bicycle facilities. This station was built as part of the  Southeast Rail Extension to RidgeGate, which began in 2016 and cost $223 million. It opened on May 17, 2019.

The RidgeGate area was annexed into Lone Tree in 2000 and is planned to anchor a major office and residential development, comprising much of Lone Tree's planned city center.

References 

RTD light rail stations
Railway stations in the United States opened in 2019
Transportation buildings and structures in Douglas County, Colorado
2019 establishments in Colorado